Ichneutica steropastis, or the flax notcher moth, is a species of moth in the family Noctuidae. It is endemic to New Zealand and can be found throughout the country from the Three Kings Islands to Stewart Island as well as in the Chatham Islands. The larvae of this species feed on a variety of native and introduced plants however the New Zealand flax is one of the more well known host plants for the larvae of this moth. The larvae are nocturnal, hiding away in the base of the plants and coming out to feed at night. They create a distinctive notch in the leaf when they feed. The adults of this species are on the wing from October to March. Although adult specimens of I. steropastis are relatively easy to recognise they might possibly be confused with I. inscripta, I. theobroma or with darker forms of I. arotis. However I. steropastis can be distinguished as it has a long dark basal forewing streak that these three species lack.

Taxonomy 
This species was first described by Edward Meyrick in 1887 as Mamestra steropastis using specimens collected in Napier, Blenheim and Christchurch by R.W. Fereday.  In 1988 J. S. Dugdale placed this species within the Tmetolophota genus. In 2019 Robert Hoare undertook a major review of New Zealand Noctuidae. During this review the genus Ichneutica was greatly expanded and the genus Tmetolophota was subsumed into that genus as a synonym. As a result of this review, this species is now known as Ichneutica steropastis.  The male lectotype specimen is held at the Natural History Museum, London.

Description 

George Hudson described the larva of this species as follows:
The host plant is not a reliable guide to confirm the identification of this species as larvae of both I. arotis and I. blenheimensis also feed on similar hosts including flax species. The larvae of I. steropastis can be distinguished from I. arotis as there are differences in the placement of the P1 head capsule and the anal shield has a minute double mound between the D2 setae which is lacking in I. arotis.
Meyrick described the adults of this species as follows:

The adult male of this species has a wingspan of between 32.5 and 45.5 mm and the female has a wingspan of between 33 and 45 mm. Although I. steropastis is relatively easily recognisable it might possibly be confused with I. inscripta, I. theobroma or with darker forms of I. arotis. However I. steropastis has long dark basal forewing streak that these other three species lack.

Distribution 
I. steropastis is endemic to New Zealand. It is common and can be found throughout the country from the Three Kings Islands to Stewart Island as well as in the Chatham Islands.

Habitat and host plant

This species inhabits the edges of native bush as well as scrubland, wetlands and coastal dunes. The larvae of I. steropastis can exist on multiple host plant species. It is best known for consuming the leaves of the New Zealand flax, but other larval host plants include endemic species in the genus Austroderia as well as introduced species in the genus Cortaderia. In particular Austroderia fulvida, A. richardii and C. selloana are all recorded as larval host species of I. steropastis as is Poa foliosa. This species has also been reared from species in the genus Libertia.  The host plant is not a reliable guide to confirm the identification of this species as larvae of both I. arotis and I. blenheimensis also feed on similar hosts including flax species.

Behaviour and life cycle 
The larvae are nocturnal, hiding away in the base of their host plants and coming out to feed at night. The larvae possibly pupate in the soil below their host plant. The adults of this species are on the wing from September to April. The adult moth is also nocturnal but is attracted to light.

Interactions with humans
The larvae of this species is regarded as a pest as it chews distinctive notches in the sides of the flax leaves. This damage ensures the flax leaf cannot then be used for weaving.

References

Moths described in 1887
Moths of New Zealand
Hadeninae
Endemic fauna of New Zealand
Taxa named by Edward Meyrick
Endemic moths of New Zealand